Monema flavescens is a moth of the family Limacodidae. It is found in Japan, Korea, the Russian Far East (Amur, Ussuri, Askold), China (Heilongjiang, Jilin, Liaoning, Inner Mongolia, Beijing, Hebei, Shandong, Henan, Shaanxi, Qinghai, Jiangsu, Shanghai, Zhejiang, Hubei, Jiangxi, Fujian, Guangdong, Guangxi), Taiwan, Philippines and Hyderabad india.

The wingspan is 30–32 mm for males and 35–39 mm for females.

The larvae are polyphagous and are considered a forestry pest.

Subspecies
Monema flavescens flavescens (China, Russian Far East, Korea, Japan)
Monema flavescens rubriceps (Matsumura, 1931) (Taiwan)

References

External links
Collection of Siberian Zoological Museum
Japanese Moths

Moths described in 1855
Limacodidae
Moths of Japan
Moths of Asia
Taxa named by Francis Walker (entomologist)